Joseph Pitre (born January 23, 1946) is an American politician. He serves as a Republican member of the New Hampshire House of Representatives, representing the town of Farmington.

Pitre attended the Community College of the Air Force, Southern New Hampshire University, and Golden Gate University.

References

Living people
Republican Party members of the New Hampshire House of Representatives
21st-century American politicians
Southern New Hampshire University alumni
Golden Gate University alumni
1946 births